The Coat of arms of Slobozia is depicted on all documents issued by the City Hall.

The mural crown with seven towers symbolizes the settlement's status as municipality.

Description and symbolism

History

Notes

References 

Slobozia
Slobozia